Earl Cochran, Jr (born April 19, 1981) is a former American football defensive end. He was signed by the Green Bay Packers as an undrafted free agent in 2003. He played college football at Alabama State.

Cochran was also a member of the Amsterdam Admirals, Minnesota Vikings, Houston Texans, and California Redwoods.

College career
During his senior season for the Hornets, Cochran amassed 9.5 sacks, which earned him All-SWAC honors.

Professional career

Green Bay Packers
Despite being undrafted, Cochran signed with the Green Bay Packers in 2003. During the 2003 preseason Earl suffered season-ending shoulder surgery and was placed on Injured Reserve, which eventually led to his release from the Packers prior to the 2004 season.

Minnesota Vikings
Cochran spent training camp with the Minnesota Vikings in 2005 but was released prior to the regular season. In week 7 of the 2005 season Earl was brought back as a member of the Vikings practice squad.

Houston Texans
In June 2006 Cochran signed a contract with the Houston Texans, but was released following the final preseason game. Later in week 11 of the 2006 season Cochran was re-signed as a member of the Texans practice squad. In week 16 Cochran saw his first NFL action as a member of the Houston Texans, when he entered into the Texans' 2006 season finale versus the Cleveland Browns and recorded two tackles and two quarterback pressures.

Amsterdam Admirals (NFL Europe)
In the spring of 2006, Cochran was the starting left defensive end for the NFL Europe Amsterdam Admirals.  He started 9 of 10 games and recorded 42 tackles, 9 assists and 5.0 sacks.  His 51 total tackles and 5 sacks led the Admirals defense.  He led the club to World Bowl XIV eventually losing to the Frankfurt Galaxy, 22–7.

External links
Just Sports Stats
Houston Texans bio

Players of American football from Birmingham, Alabama
American football linebackers
American football defensive ends
American football defensive tackles
Alabama State Hornets football players
Green Bay Packers players
Amsterdam Admirals players
Minnesota Vikings players
Houston Texans players
Sacramento Mountain Lions players
1981 births
Living people